Alias Jimmy Valentine may refer to:

 Alias Jimmy Valentine, a 1910 play by Paul Armstrong, based on the O. Henry short story, "A Retrieved Reformation"
 Alias Jimmy Valentine (1915 film), an American silent film directed by Maurice Tourneur, based on the play
 Alias Jimmy Valentine (1920 film), an American silent film directed by Edmund Mortimer and Arthur Ripley, based on the play
 Alias Jimmy Valentine (1928 film), an American film directed by Jack Conway, based on the play
 Alias Jimmy Valentine (radio program), an American radio broadcast 1938–1939, based on the play

See also
 The Affairs of Jimmy Valentine, a 1942 American film directed by Bernard Vorhaus, based on the play by Paul Armstrong